20 Grandes Éxitos may refer to:

 20 Grandes Éxitos (Los Fabulosos Cadillacs album)
 20 Grandes Éxitos (Enanitos Verdes album) or 20 Éxitos Originales
 20 – Grandes Éxitos (Laura Pausini album) or 20 – The Greatest Hits

See also
 Grandes éxitos (disambiguation)